Lya is a female first or given name and is usually thought of as a variant of "Lia" or "Leah." 

Notable people with the name include:

 Lya Barrioz (21st century) Nicaraguan singer
 Lya De Putti (1899–1931), Hungarian actress
 Lya Luft (born 1938), Brazilian writer
 Lya Lys (1908–1986), German American actress
 Lya Mara (1897–1960), German actress
 Lya Stern (born 1950), Romanian American violinist